Torticollis, also known as wry neck, is a dystonic condition defined by an abnormal, asymmetrical head or neck position, which may be due to a variety of causes. The term torticollis is derived from the Latin words tortus, meaning "twisted" and collum, meaning "neck." 

The most common case has no obvious cause, and the pain and difficulty with turning the head usually goes away after a few days, even without treatment in adults.

Signs and symptoms
Torticollis is a fixed or dynamic tilt, rotation, with flexion or extension of the head and/or neck.
The type of torticollis can be described depending on the positions of the head and neck.
 laterocollis: the head is tipped toward the shoulder
 rotational torticollis: the head rotates along the longitudinal  axis
 anterocollis: forward flexion of the head and neck
 retrocollis: hyperextension of head and neck backward
A combination of these movements may often be observed. Torticollis can be a disorder in itself as well as a symptom in other conditions.

Other symptoms include:
 Neck pain
 Occasional formation of a mass
 Thickened or tight sternocleidomastoid muscle
 Tenderness on the cervical spine
 Tremor in head
 Unequal shoulder heights
 Decreased neck movement

Causes
A multitude of conditions may lead to the development of torticollis including: muscular fibrosis, congenital spine abnormalities, or toxic or traumatic brain injury.
A rough categorization discerns between congenital torticollis and acquired torticollis.

Other categories include:
 Osseous
 Traumatic
 CNS/PNS
 Ocular
 Non-muscular soft tissue
 Spasmodic
 Drug induced
 Oral ties (lip and tongue ties)

Congenital muscular torticollis
Congenital muscular torticollis is the most common torticollis that is present at birth. The cause of congenital muscular torticollis is unclear. Birth trauma or intrauterine malposition is considered to be the cause of damage to the sternocleidomastoid muscle in the neck. Other alterations to the muscle tissue arise from repetitive microtrauma within the womb or a sudden change in the calcium concentration in the body that causes a prolonged period of muscle contraction.

Any of these mechanisms can result in a shortening or excessive contraction of the sternocleidomastoid muscle, which curtails its range of motion in both rotation and lateral bending. The head is typically tilted in lateral bending toward the affected muscle and rotated toward the opposite side. In other words, the head itself is tilted in the direction of the shortened muscle, with the chin tilted in the opposite direction.

Congenital torticollis is presented at 1–4 weeks of age, and a hard mass usually develops. It is normally diagnosed using ultrasonography and a color histogram or clinically by evaluating the infant's passive cervical range of motion.

Congenital torticollis constitutes the majority of cases seen in paediatric clinical practice. The reported incidence of congenital torticollis is 0.3-2.0%. Sometimes a mass, such as a sternocleidomastoid tumor, is noted in the affected muscle. Congenital torticollis may not resolve on its own, and can result in rare complications including plagiocephaly.

Benign paroxysmal torticollis is a rare disorder affecting infants. Recurrent attacks may last up to a week. The condition improves by age 2. The cause is thought to be genetic.

Acquired torticollis
Noncongenital muscular torticollis may result from muscle spasm, trauma, scarring or disease of cervical vertebrae, adenitis, tonsillitis, rheumatism, enlarged cervical glands, retropharyngeal abscess, or cerebellar tumors. It may be spasmodic (clonic) or permanent (tonic). The latter type may be due to Pott's Disease (tuberculosis of the spine).
 A self-limiting spontaneously occurring form of torticollis with one or more painful neck muscles is by far the most common ('stiff neck') and will pass spontaneously in 1–4 weeks. Usually the sternocleidomastoid muscle or the trapezius muscle is involved. Sometimes draughts, colds, or unusual postures are implicated; however, in many cases, no clear cause is found. These episodes are commonly seen by physicians.
Most commonly this self-limiting form relates to an untreated dental occlusal dysfunction, which is brought on by clenching and grinding the teeth during sleep. Once the occlusion is treated it will completely resolve. Treatment is accomplished with an occlusal appliance, and equilibration of the dentition.
 Tumors of the skull base (posterior fossa tumors) can compress the nerve supply to the neck and cause torticollis, and these problems must be treated surgically.
 Infections in the posterior pharynx can irritate the nerves supplying the neck muscles and cause torticollis, and these infections may be treated with antibiotics if they are not too severe, but could require surgical debridement in intractable cases.
 Ear infections and surgical removal of the adenoids can cause an entity known as Grisel's syndrome, a subluxation of the upper cervical joints, mostly the atlantoaxial joint, due to inflammatory laxity of the ligaments caused by an infection.
 The use of certain drugs, such as antipsychotics, can cause torticollis.
 Antiemetics - Neuroleptic Class - Phenothiazines
 There are many other rare causes of torticollis.  A very rare cause of acquired torticollis is fibrodysplasia ossificans progressiva (FOP), the hallmark of which is malformed great toes.

Spasmodic torticollis
 Torticollis with recurrent, but transient contraction of the muscles of the neck and especially of the sternocleidomastoid, is called spasmodic torticollis. Synonyms are "intermittent torticollis", "cervical dystonia" or "idiopathic cervical dystonia", depending on cause.

Trochlear torticollis 

Torticollis can caused by damage to the trochlear nerve (fourth cranial nerve), which supplies the superior oblique muscle of the eye. The superior oblique muscle is involved in depression, abduction, and intorsion of the eye. When the trochlear nerve is damaged, the eye is extorted because the superior oblique is not functioning. The affected person will have vision problems unless they turn their head away from the side that is affected, causing intorsion of the eye and balancing out the extorsion of the eye. This can be diagnosed by the Bielschowsky test, also called the head-tilt test, where the head is turned to the affected side. A positive test occurs when the affected eye elevates, seeming to float up.

Anatomy 
The underlying anatomical distortion causing torticollis is a shortened sternocleidomastoid muscle. This is the muscle of the neck that originates at the sternum and clavicle and inserts on the mastoid process of the temporal bone on the same side. There are two sternocleidomastoid muscles in the human body and when they both contract, the neck is flexed. The main blood supply for these muscles come from the occipital artery, superior thyroid artery, transverse scapular artery and transverse cervical artery. The main innervation to these muscles is from cranial nerve XI (the accessory nerve) but the second, third and fourth cervical nerves are also involved. Pathologies in these blood and nerve supplies can lead to torticollis.

Diagnosis

Evaluation of a child with torticollis begins with history taking to determine circumstances surrounding birth and any possibility of trauma or associated symptoms. Physical examination reveals decreased rotation and bending to the side opposite from the affected muscle. Some say that congenital cases more often involve the right side, but there is not complete agreement about this in published studies. Evaluation should include a thorough neurologic examination, and the possibility of associated conditions such as developmental dysplasia of the hip and clubfoot should be examined.  Radiographs of the cervical spine should be obtained to rule out obvious bony abnormality, and MRI should be considered if there is concern about structural problems or other conditions.

Ultrasonography can be used to visualize muscle tissue, with a colour histogram generated to determine cross-sectional area and thickness of the muscle.

Evaluation by an optometrist or an ophthalmologist should be considered in children to ensure that the torticollis is not caused by vision problems (IV cranial nerve palsy, nystagmus-associated "null position," etc.).

Differential diagnosis for torticollis includes
 Cranial nerve IV palsy
 Spasmus nutans
 Sandifer syndrome
 Myasthenia gravis
 Cerebrospinal fluid leak

Cervical dystonia appearing in adulthood has been believed to be idiopathic in nature, as specific imaging techniques most often find no specific cause.

Treatment 
Initially, the condition is treated with physical therapies, such as stretching to release tightness, strengthening exercises to improve muscular balance, and handling to stimulate symmetry. A TOT collar is sometimes applied. Early initiation of treatment is very important for full recovery and to decrease chance of relapse.

Physical therapy 
Physical therapy is an option for treating torticollis in a non-invasive and cost-effective manner. In the children above 1 year of age, surgical release of the tight sternocleidomastoid muscle is indicated along with aggressive therapy and appropriate splinting. Occupational therapy rehabilitation in Congenital muscular torticollis concentrates on observation, orthosis, gentle stretching, myofascial release techniques, parents’ counseling-training, and home exercise program. While outpatient infant physiotherapy is effective, home therapy performed by a parent or guardian is just as effective in reversing the effects of congenital torticollis. It is important for physical therapists to educate parents on the importance of their role in the treatment and to create a home treatment plan together with them for the best results for their child. Five components have been recognized as the "first choice intervention" in PT for treatment of torticollis and include neck passive range of motion, neck and trunk active range of motion, development of symmetrical movement, environmental adaptations, and caregiver education. In therapy, parents or guardians should expect their child to be provided with these important components, explained in detail below. Lateral neck flexion and overall range of motion can be regained quicker in newborns when parents conduct physical therapy exercises several times a day.

Physical therapists should teach parents and guardians to perform the following exercises:
 Stretching the neck and trunk muscles actively. Parents can help promote this stretching at home with infant positioning. For example, prone positioning will encourage the child to lift their chin off the ground, thereby strengthening their bilateral neck and spine extensor muscles, and stretching their neck flexor muscles. Active rotation exercises in supine, sitting or prone position by using toys, lights and sounds to attract infant's attention to turn neck and look toward the non-affected side.
 Stretching the muscle in a prone position passively. Passive stretching is manual, and does not include infant involvement. Two people can be involved in these stretches, one person stabilizing the infant while the other holds the head and slowly brings it through the available range of motion. Passive stretching should not be painful to the child, and should be stopped if the child resists. Also, discontinue the stretch if changes in breathing or circulation are seen or felt.
 Stretching the muscle in a lateral position supported by a pillow (have infant lie on the side with the neck supported by pillow). Affected side should be against the pillow to deviate the neck towards the non-affected side.
 Environmental adaptations can control posture in strollers, car seats  and swings (using U-shaped neck pillow or blankets to hold neck in neutral position)
 Passive cervical rotation (much like stretching when being supported by a pillow, have affected side down)
 Position infant in the crib with affected side by the wall so they must turn to the non-affected side to face out

Physical therapists often encourage parents and caregivers of children with torticollis to modify the environment to improve neck movements and position. Modifications may include:
 Adding neck supports to the car seat to attain optimal neck alignment
 Reducing time spent in a single position
 Using toys to encourage the child to look in the direction of limited neck movement
 Alternating sides when bottle or breastfeeding
 Encouraging prone playtime (tummy time). Although the Back to Sleep campaign promotes infants sleeping on their backs to avoid sudden infant death syndrome during sleep, parents should still ensure that their infants spend some waking hours on their stomachs.

Microcurrent therapy 
A Korean study has recently introduced an additional treatment called microcurrent therapy that may be effective in treating congenital torticollis. For this therapy to be effective the children should be under three months of age and have torticollis involving the entire sternocleidomastoid muscle with a palpable mass and a muscle thickness over 10 mm. Microcurrent therapy sends minute electrical signals into tissue to restore the normal frequencies in cells. Microcurrent therapy is completely painless and children can only feel the probe from the machine on their skin.

Microcurrent therapy is thought to increase ATP and protein synthesis as well as enhance blood flow, reduce muscle spasms and decrease pain along with inflammation. It should be used in addition to regular stretching exercises and ultrasound diathermy. Ultrasound diathermy generates heat deep within body tissues to help with contractures, pain and muscle spasms as well as decrease inflammation. This combination of treatments shows remarkable outcomes in the duration of time children are kept in rehabilitation programs: Micocurrent therapy can cut the length of a rehabilitation program almost in half with a full recovery seen after 2.6 months.

About 5–10% of cases fail to respond to stretching and require surgical release of the muscle.

Surgery 
Surgical release involves the two heads of the sternocleidomastoid muscle being dissected free. This surgery can be minimally invasive and done laparoscopically. Usually surgery is performed on those who are over 12 months old. The surgery is for those who do not respond to physical therapy or botulinum toxin injection or have a very fibrotic sternocleidomastoid muscle. After surgery the child will be required to wear a soft neck collar (also called a Callot's cast). There will be an intense physiotherapy program for 3–4 months as well as strengthening exercises for the neck muscles.

Other treatments 

Other treatments include:
 Rest and analgesics for acute cases
 Diazepam or other muscle relaxants
 Botulinum toxin
 Encouraging active movements for children 6–8 months of age
 Ultrasound diathermy

Prognosis 
Studies and evidence from clinical practice show that 85–90% of cases of congenital torticollis are resolved with conservative treatment such as physical therapy. Earlier intervention is shown to be more effective and faster than later treatments. More than 98% of infants with torticollis treated before 1 month of age recover by 2.5 months of age. Infants between 1 and 6 months usually require about 6 months of treatment. After that point, therapy will take closer to 9 months, and it is less likely that the torticollis will be fully resolved. It is possible that torticollis will resolve spontaneously, but chance of relapse is possible. For this reason, infants should be reassessed by their physical therapist or other provider 3–12 months after their symptoms have resolved.

Other animals

In veterinary literature usually only the lateral bend of head and neck is termed torticollis, whereas the analogon to the rotatory torticollis in humans is called a head tilt. The most frequently encountered form of torticollis in domestic pets is the head tilt, but occasionally a lateral bend of the head and neck to one side is encountered.

Head tilt
Causes for a head tilt in domestic animals are either diseases of the central or peripheral vestibular system or relieving posture due to neck pain. Known causes for head tilt in domestic animals include:
 Encephalitozoon cuniculi (or E. cuniculi) infection in rabbits
 parasitic infestation by the nematode (roundworm) Baylisascaris procyonis in rabbits
 Inner ear infection
 Hypothyroidism in dogs
 Disease of the VIIIth cranial nerve the N. Vestibulocochlearis through trauma, infection, inflammation or neoplasia
 Disease of the brain stem through either stroke, trauma or neoplasia
 Damage to the vestibular organ due to toxicity, inflammation or impaired blood supply
 Geriatric vestibular syndrome in dogs

Notes

References

External links 
 Head Tilt: Causes and Treatment

Ailments of unknown cause
Deforming dorsopathies
Rabbit diseases
Symptoms